The Thaya is a river in Central Europe, the longest tributary to the river Morava. Its source is in two smaller rivers, namely the German Thaya (Deutsche Thaya)  and the Moravian Thaya, flowing together at Raabs an der Thaya.

The confluence of Thaya and Morava is the southernmost and the lowest point of Moravia.

Its name means "the inert". There is also a small village which bears the name Dyje, located near Znojmo.

Geography
In its upper reaches, the Thaya flows through deep gorges (Podyjí), along which it passes many castles and chateaus. In Moravia, it has been dammed in several locations.

Thaya gathers waters from the western half of Moravia and the adjacent part of Lower Austria. Its biggest tributaries are Svratka and Jihlava, flowing together into the middle one of the Nové Mlýny reservoirs.

Important cities and towns along the Thaya:
 Raabs an der Thaya
 Drosendorf-Zissersdorf
 Vranov nad Dyji
 Hardegg
 Znojmo
 Laa an der Thaya
 Lednice
 Břeclav

Dams
All the dams are situated in Czech Republic. They are used for irrigation, hydroelectricity and flood protection.

References

 
Rivers of the South Moravian Region
Břeclav District
Znojmo District
Rivers of Lower Austria
International rivers of Europe

Rivers of Austria